Major-General Henry Richard Abadie  (25 March 1841 – 9 May 1915) was a British Army officer. He was GOC Eastern District at the end of the 19th century and the Lieutenant Governor of Jersey for four years thereafter.

Background
Abadie was the son of Louis Pascal Abadie, who came from Chateau de Pellepoix in France. He was married first to Kate Sandeman and following her death in 1883 to Caroline, daughter of Colonel Fanshawe Gostling in 1890. His four sons with Kate Sandeman all died while on military service: two in Africa to disease and two during the First World War.

Military career

Abadie joined the army in 1858 and served in the 1868 Expedition to Abyssinia, where he was involved in the Battle of Magdala. He was made a captain 1872 and fought in the Second Anglo-Afghan War, including the Battle of Kandahar in 1880. He was with the 9th Lancers and commanded the Cavalry Depot at Canterbury from 1894 to 1897.

From 1899 to 1900 he commanded Eastern District, during which he was promoted to major-general and awarded a Companion of the Order of the Bath.

Jersey
Thereafter Abadie was appointed the Lieutenant Governor of Jersey, a post he held until 1904. There is a painting of him at his regimental museum in Derby by John St Helier Lander, an artist whom he met while living in Jersey.

References 

|-

1841 births
1915 deaths
9th Queen's Royal Lancers officers
British Army major generals
British military personnel of the Abyssinian War
British military personnel of the Second Anglo-Afghan War
Companions of the Order of the Bath
Governors of Jersey